Colin McCredie (born 8 June 1972 in Dumbarton, Scotland) is a Scottish actor, best known for his role as DC Stuart Fraser in the STV drama Taggart, Nick Morrison in the BBC Scotland Soap Opera River City and in the films Shallow Grave, Night is Day and The Missing Postman.

Biography
Colin grew up in Perth and began acting as a child at Perth Theatre before attending the Scottish Youth Theatre. He now appears in CBeebies' Woolly and Tig with his real daughter.

He trained at the Royal Scottish Academy of Music and Drama in Glasgow and graduated in 1993. He joined Taggart aged 23 and appeared in over 75 episodes from 1995 to 2010.

In December 2009 McCredie was informed that he and his character would not be returning for the next series of Taggart.

On 15 October 2010, it was announced that McCredie would be joining the BBC Scotland drama River City, playing the role of Nick Morrison.

McCredie is a patron of the Scottish Youth Theatre and a supporter of his hometown football team St Johnstone, where he sponsors a player.

On 10 January 2011 it was announced that McCredie would be joining Sharleen Spiteri and Dawn Steele in the forthcoming Scottish film Between Weathers. He appeared in the BBC Radio 4 Afternoon Play Care by Clara Glynn, and also as the Dad in the CBeebies series Woolly and Tig which stars his daughter Betsy and sister-in-law Jenny Ryan and is made by Tattiemoon, the makers of Balamory.

He played Alan McCombes in the Tommy Sheridan play I, Tommy by Ian Pattison at The Gilded Balloon Edinburgh in August and at King's Theatre, Glasgow in November 2012.

Television
Woolly and Tig - Tattiemoon for CBeebies
River City - BBC Scotland
Taggart - STV Productions
The Missing Postman - BBC Scotland
The Pen - BBC Scotland Tartan Short
Karmic Mothers - BBC Scotland Tartan Short
Dr. Finlay - played Gerald Hynde
Take the High Road
The Holy City - played Patrick
The Justice Game - played Mickey
Fish Out of Water - played Hunter
Takin' Over the Asylum - played Phil
Mayflies - Scott

Theatre
I Tommy - played Alan McCombes (Gilded Balloon Edinburgh and King's Theatre Glasgow)
The Ching Room - played Rory (Glasgow Oranmor, Edinburgh Traverse and Manchester Royal Exchange)
Lysistrata - played Lysistrata (Glasgow Oranmor)
The Corstorphine Road Nativity - played Wise Frankencense (Edinburgh Festival Theatre)
Dealer's Choice - played Mugsy (Tron Theatre Company)
Candide - played Candide (Suspect Culture Tour)
Passing Places - played Brian (Traverse Theatre)
Teechers - played Salty - (Byre Theatre)
Glengarry Glen Ross - played Lingk (Arches Theatre)

Film
Night is Day - played Taylor, in post-production (2011)
The Perpetual Twilight of Gregor Black - (Cliffhanger Films)
Pandaemonium - played Royal Messenger (Mariner Films)
Small Faces - played Doug (Skyline)
Shallow Grave - played Cameron (Figment Films)

Radio
Care - BBC Radio 4 March 2011 - played Charlie Fleming

References

External links

1972 births
Living people
Scottish male film actors
Scottish male television actors
Alumni of the Royal Conservatoire of Scotland
People from Perth, Scotland
Scottish male radio actors